Isabel de la Cerda also known as Isabel de la Cerda Pérez de Guzmán (Seville c.1329 - after 1383) was the only surviving daughter of Luis de la Cerda and his first wife Leonor de Guzmán; she was Lady of Puerto de Santa María and titular Princess of Fortuna. She was a member of the House de la Cerda.

Life
Isabel was born in Seville around 1329, she was the youngest of three surviving children; her elder brothers were Luis and Juan de la Cerda y Guzmán, she had five other siblings who died in childhood. Her paternal grandfather was Alfonso de la Cerda, heir to the throne of Castile but disinherited in favor of his uncle, Sancho IV of Castile.

She first married in 1346 to Rodrigo Pérez Ponce de León; "Ruy Pérez Ponce de León" confirmed receipt of the dowry of "doña Isabel de la Cerda" by charter dated 11 March 1349. The couple were married up until before 26 May 1354, when Rodrigo died; they had no children.

A charter dated 30 December 1353 records the agreement between Isabel and her two brothers over their father's estate, who had died in 1348.

Isabel remained unmarried for up to fourteen years, she then remarried at Seville on 15 September 1370 to Bernal de Foix, an illegitimate son of Gaston III, Count of Foix . After the marriage, Bernal was made Count of Medinaceli. As Isabel had a strong claim on the Castillian throne, on 25 May 1366 she was granted large estates by Henry II of Castile on the condition that she relinquish all claim to the Crown of Castile for herself and her heirs. The Medinaceli dukes had extensive estates in the Spanish provinces of Soria and Guadalajara.

Isabel and Bernal had two children:
Gaston (c 1371–1404), succeeded his father as Count of Medinaceli
Maria (died 1381), died in childhood

Isabel died after 1383 and was buried at the Monastery of Santa María de Huerta. Bernal died in 1391 and was succeeded by their son, Gaston. The county of Medinaceli was later turned into a Duchy by Isabella I of Castile.

References

House de la Cerda
14th-century Castilians
14th-century Spanish women